Brisset is a surname. Notable people with the surname include:

 Jean-Pierre Brisset (1837–1919), French writer
 Mickaël Brisset (born 1985), French professional football player